Police Stop! is a British television documentary series, narrated and presented by Graham Cole, best known for his role as PC Tony Stamp in the Thames Television drama series The Bill, that was first developed in 1993 as a Direct-to-video series by creator Bill Rudgard. The series compiles footage filmed on cameras mounted in police cars and helicopters, with occasional material from road-side or hand-held cameras, with each episode focusing on a different type of road related crime, such as speeding, driving without due care and attention or dangerous overtaking, or in more extreme cases, hazards relating to weather conditions or car chases involving wanted criminals.

Seven episodes were released straight to VHS before a deal was struck with BSkyB to broadcast the series on Sky One, with a new episode to be broadcast each year from 1996 onwards. A total of fourteen episodes were filmed, with the final episode, a special focusing on policing in the United States, airing in 2001. Prior to the broadcast of Police Stop! 5, Sky also broadcast the first four episodes previously released exclusively to VHS. The series also broadcast in the United States on Syndication, which notably resulted in several episodes being cut to remove footage for which clearance rights were unavailable.

The series also spawned an international spin-off, which began broadcasting in New Zealand in 1996. The series aired on TV3, and was fronted by former Australian race car driver Peter Brock. The series' format was similar to the British versions, using footage from both the United Kingdom and United States, with additional content from the New Zealand police. Later series were retitled Police Stop – Caught in the Act, which in addition to car chase footage, also featured footage from security cameras, often from shops or public places. Footage also extended to Brock himself working alongside the New Zealand police, giving an insight into general lines of police work. Although the series concluded in 1998, a special episode was screened in 2006 as a tribute to Brock, a week after he died in a Motorsport accident.

Broadcast
The first episode of Police Stop! was released on video in 1993, and was widely successful, partly due to a campaign ran by The Sun, which offered readers a discount when ordered directly from the manufacturer. As such, a second video followed swiftly in April 1994. The second video is the only episode not to be presented by Graham Cole, instead fronted by Inspector David Rowland, a traffic division inspector from the Metropolitan Police. Although the episode was narrated by Cole. Graham Cole returned to voice two episodes focusing on policing in the United States, the first aptly titled Police Stop! America and the second Police Stop! Or We'll Shoot, which predominantly focuses on the work of the Texas Rangers. Police Stop! 3 and Police Stop! 4 both followed in 1995, before a compilation video, entitled Worst of Police Stop!, followed in 1996.

Police Stop! and Police Stop! 2 were produced with the co-operation of several British police forces, who contributed most of the material. Aside from the two American specials, Police Stop! 3 and Police Stop! 4 also included material primarily from the United States and mainland Europe. Notably, all seven videos were exempt from classification. From Police Stop! 5 onwards, the series transferred to Sky One, where a new episode was broadcast yearly until 2001. From this point onwards, the series continued to use more clips from non-British sources.

Police Stop! was regularly repeated on Men and Motors and ITV4 during the late 2000s, although the repeats resulted in some confusion for viewers when both channels erroneously listed the series as being presented by Alastair Stewart, confusing it with the former ITV series Police Camera Action!, which Stewart fronted. Notably, only ten of the fourteen episodes were repeated on both channels, with Police Stop! America, Police Stop! Or We'll Shoot, Worst of Police Stop! and Police Stop! 11 remaining unrepeated. Labyrinth Media, who produced the series, also produced two further direct-to-video releases featuring a similar format.
Riot Police, released in 1994, features graphic footage of riots, including the riot of March 31, 1990 in Trafalgar Square, London. Real Life Rescues, presented by Alastair Stewart and also released in 1994, features camera footage of real-life rescues involving the emergency services.

Episodes

See also
 Police Camera Action! - a similar police video programme shown on ITV1 with a similar format.
 Road Wars - widely recognised as the replacement of Police Stop! Also produced by Bill Rudgard.
 Brit Cops - police reality show currently showing on Sky.
 Police Interceptors - show about traffic cops broadcast on Channel 5.
 Traffic Cops - also called Car Wars and Motorway Cops. BBC TV series with a similar format.
 Sky Cops - series about helicopter police on BBC One.
 Street Crime UK - TV show on Bravo documenting police work in the UK.

References

External links

1993 British television series debuts
2002 British television series endings
1990s British documentary television series
2000s British documentary television series
Documentary television series about policing
English-language television shows
Sky UK original programming